Desire Pascal Eboussi Mekongo (born 14 March 1998) is a Cameroonian professional footballer who plays as a centre-back for Pierikos.

Career
Eboussi signed with USL club Colorado Springs Switchbacks in March 2017. Eboussi had a slow start to the season but finally broke out scoring his first goal on September 3 against Sacramento Republic FC in a 2–2 draw. This performance earned Eboussi his first spot on the USL's Team of the Week. Eboussi ended the 2017 season playing in 17 matches for the switchbacks with 11 of them being starts scoring 2 goals. On December 20, 2017 the Switchbacks announced that Eboussi would be returning for the 2018 season. 

On 1 December 2018 the player signs on Czech club side MFK Vyškov. On 1 January 2019 the player signs a loan of one year on San Antonio FC in the USL Championship.

Ahead of the 2020 season, Eboussi and teammate Donovan Ewolo joined Swedish Division 1 side IFK Luleå on loan but their arrival at the club was delayed due to travel bans arising from the COVID-19 pandemic. He made the bench once for Luleå before returning to Vyškov.

At the end of January 2021, Eboussi joined Sudanese club Al-Merrikh SC. Ahead of the 2021-22 season, Eboussi joiedn Greek club Pierikos. On 2

References

External links
Switchbacks bio

1998 births
Living people
Cameroonian footballers
Cameroonian expatriate footballers
Association football defenders
Colorado Springs Switchbacks FC players
San Antonio FC players
MFK Vyškov players
IFK Luleå players
Al-Merrikh SC players
Pierikos F.C. players
USL Championship players
Cameroonian expatriate sportspeople in the United States
Cameroonian expatriate sportspeople in the Czech Republic
Cameroonian expatriate sportspeople in Sweden
Cameroonian expatriate sportspeople in Sudan
Cameroonian expatriate sportspeople in Greece
Expatriate soccer players in the United States
Expatriate footballers in the Czech Republic
Expatriate footballers in Sweden
Expatriate footballers in Sudan
Expatriate footballers in Greece